Anna Birgitta Hedenmo, née Olsson (born 21 March 1961) is a Swedish journalist and television presenter who has worked for SVT since 1993. She is best known as the presenter of Agenda and the interview show Min Sanning. She has as well been a news reader for Rapport and Aktuellt. During the 2010 and 2014 General Election in Sweden she and Mats Knutson presented the traditional party leaders interrogations as well as the final debate with all the party leaders. Other shows that Hedenmo has presented include Vi i femman (as judge in the knowledge section), SVT  coverage in 2003 of the Euro-vote, Bumerang, Debatt, Millenniet jorden runt (show that covered the new Millennium and how every country celebrated it on New Year's Eve) and Gomorron Sverige.

References

External links 

Living people
1961 births
21st-century Swedish journalists
Swedish women journalists
Swedish women television presenters
Swedish television personalities
Journalists from Stockholm
20th-century Swedish journalists